The Garber Sandstone is a geologic formation from the Permian Period in Oklahoma. It serves as an important aquifer, the Garber-Wellington Aquifer, in Logan, Oklahoma, and Cleveland counties of central Oklahoma.

The upper portion of the Garber is associated with extensive baryte mineralization associated with desert rose occurrences in the outcrop area.

See also

 List of fossiliferous stratigraphic units in Oklahoma

References

Permian geology of Oklahoma